In mathematics, the notion of the continuity of functions is not immediately extensible to set-valued functions between two sets A and B. 
The dual concepts of upper hemicontinuity and lower hemicontinuity facilitate such an extension. 
A set-valued function that has both properties is said to be continuous in an analogy to the property of the same name for functions.

Roughly speaking, a function is upper hemicontinuous if when (1) a convergent sequence of points in the domain maps to a sequence of sets in the range which (2) contain another convergent sequence, then the image of the limiting point in the domain must contain the limit of the sequence in the range. 
Lower hemicontinuity essentially reverses this, saying if a sequence in the domain converges, given a point in the range of the limit, then you can find a sub-sequence whose image contains a convergent sequence to the given point.

Upper hemicontinuity

Sequential characterization

if  and  then 
If B is compact, the converse is also true.

Closed graph theorem

The graph of a set-valued function  is the set defined by 

If  is an upper hemicontinuous set-valued function with closed domain (that is, the set of points  where  is not the empty set is closed) and closed values (i.e.  is closed for all ), then  is closed. 
If  is compact, then the converse is also true.

Lower hemicontinuity

A set-valued function  is said to be lower hemicontinuous at the point   
if for any open set   intersecting  there exists a neighbourhood  of  such that  intersects  for all  (Here     means nonempty intersection ).

Sequential characterization

Open graph theorem

A set-valued function  have  if the set 

If  has an open graph  then  has open upper and lower sections and if  has open lower sections then it is lower hemicontinuous.

The open graph theorem says that if  is a set-valued function with convex values and open upper sections, then  has an open graph in  if and only if  is lower hemicontinuous.

Properties

Set-theoretic, algebraic and topological operations on set-valued functions (like union, composition, sum, convex hull, closure)
usually preserve the type of continuity. But this should be taken with appropriate care since, for example, there exists a pair of lower hemicontinuous set-valued functions whose intersection is not lower hemicontinuous. 
This can be fixed upon strengthening continuity properties: if one of those lower hemicontinuous multifunctions has open graph then their intersection is again lower hemicontinuous.

Crucial to set-valued analysis (in view of applications) are the investigation of single-valued selections and approximations to set-valued functions. 
Typically lower hemicontinuous set-valued functions admit single-valued selections (Michael selection theorem, Bressan–Colombo directionally continuous selection theorem, Fryszkowski decomposable map selection). 
Likewise, upper hemicontinuous maps admit approximations (e.g. Ancel–Granas–Górniewicz–Kryszewski theorem).

Implications for continuity

If a set-valued function is both upper hemicontinuous and lower hemicontinuous, it is said to be continuous. 
A continuous function is in all cases both upper and lower hemicontinuous.

Other concepts of continuity

The upper and lower hemicontinuity might be viewed as usual continuity:

 is lower [resp. upper] hemicontinuous if and only if the mapping  is continuous where the hyperspace P(B) has been endowed with the lower [resp. upper] Vietoris topology.

(For the notion of hyperspace compare also power set and function space).

Using lower and upper Hausdorff uniformity we can also define the so-called upper and lower semicontinuous maps in the sense of Hausdorff (also known as metrically lower / upper semicontinuous maps).

See also

Notes

References

  
 
 
 
 
 

Theory of continuous functions
Mathematical analysis
Variational analysis